MV Isle of Inisheer is a RoPax ferry owned by Irish Continental Group and operated by Irish Ferries.

History

Merchant Ferries

The Inisheer was built in 2000 as the Northern Merchant by Astilleros Españoles S.A. in Seville, Spain for Merchant Ferries and was supposed originally to operate in the Irish Sea, likely between Liverpool and Dublin.  However, the merger of Merchant Ferries with Norse Irish Ferries forming Norse Merchant Ferries caused the newly formed company to have excess capacity.

Norfolkline

As a result, the Northern Merchant instead was chartered to Norfolkline for their Dover-Dunkerque service. Through her time with Norfolkline, she gradually gained several modifications, most notably a cow-catcher and sliding bows instead of the typical ramps, and twin-level loading.

She was replaced on the Dover-Dunkerque service in March 2006 after the newbuild Maersk Delft entered service. Following her phase-out, she was dry-docked, repainted and modified back to vanilla configuration, removing the cow-catchers, sliding doors and twin-level loading, and returning the ramps on both the bow and stern.

Acciona Trasmediterránea

Afterwards, she entered service with Acciona Trasmediterránea in May. She was temporarily renamed Murillo Dos, and shortly afterwards renamed the Zurbaran. The name lasted until 2019, when she was renamed Ciudad de Mahón, alongside obtaining a new paint job.

Irish Ferries

In November 2021, it was announced that the Ciudad de Mahón was acquired by Irish Continental Group, and was due to return to Dover on the Dover-Calais sailing in Q1 2022. She sailed her last sailing for Trasmediterránea on January 31, 2022. The next day, ownership was transferred and she was renamed Isle of Inisheer. A week later, she departed Barcelona for the Fayard A/S shipyard next to Munkebo, near Odense in Denmark for re-installation of cow-catchers, sliding doors and other necessary modifications for operation into and out of Dover.

References

See also
 MS Kaiarahi, a sister ship
 MS Finbo Cargo, a sister ship

1999 ships